Flatrock Hill is a mountain in Barnstable County, Massachusetts. Discovery Hill is located northwest and Faunces Mountain is located east of Flatrock Hill.

References

Mountains of Massachusetts
Mountains of Barnstable County, Massachusetts